The Anatolian Express is one of the four direct train services operating between İstanbul and Ankara. The train is an overnight train consisting of eight sleeping cars and one dining car. The train was the first non-international train to consist of a sleeping car in Turkey. The train was operated by the CIWL from 1927 to 1950. From 1950 on, TCDD operates the train.

Timetable
The Anatolian Express runs every night from both termini.

References

Railway services introduced in 1927
Named passenger trains of Turkey
Night trains